Start-Up is a 2019 South Korean comedy-drama film written and directed by Choi Jung-yeol. Based on the webtoon Start by Jo Geum-san, the film stars Ma Dong-seok, Park Jung-min, Jung Hae-in, Yum Jung-ah and Choi Sung-eun. It was released on December 18, 2019.

Plot
Against his mother's advice, Go Taek-il leaves home and ends up working at a Chinese restaurant run by a huge man named Geo-seok. At the same time, his friend Woo Sang-pil starts working for a private loan business. The two young men experience the ups and downs of being adults.

Taek-il, a rebel who only deviates from day to day. That day too, was caught by the police station for riding without a helmet with his best friend Sangpil, who bought a second-hand motorcycle by paying the school fees for the GED. Taek-il, who was slapped by his mother Jeong-hye who ran after receiving her call, left the house impulsively the next day and headed for Gunsan. He had nothing to do, so he stopped by a nearby Chinese restaurant to eat, but when he saw the short-haired chef Megaseok, he felt unusual energy.

Afterward, when he sees a job posting at a Chinese restaurant asking for a delivery man, he immediately enters the store and volunteers to write for him. As soon as he saw the option, the president noticed that he was a child who left home at once, and said that it would be difficult for him to run away for a longer period of time. After that, Taek-il lives with the president's house, and he gets close to mega-seok as well.

Meanwhile, Sang-pil, who lives with his grandmother with dementia, desperately needs a job and finds a job with the help of his acquaintance brother, Dong-hwa Kim. That job is loan business. At first, I expected that Dong-hwa would make a lot of money with just a little effort because the work was done so peacefully. However, when he went to a butcher's shop to collect money, he was beaten nice by the boss and became sick, and when he found out that among the customers who had borrowed money from the company, Taek-il's mother Jeong-hye changed the situation.

In addition, the toast shop that Jeong-hye opened while using her debt was ordered to be demolished because it was an illegal building. Taek-il, who learned of this after a while, rushed to the store, but was helpless by the tyranny of the loan sharks.

Cast

Main
 Ma Dong-seok as Geo-seok
 Park Jung-min as Go Taek-il
 Jung Hae-in as Woo Sang-pil
 Yum Jung-ah as Yoon Jung-hye
 Choi Sung-eun as So Kyung-joo

Supporting
 Kim Jong-soo as President Gong
 Bang Eun-jung as Kim Go-eun
 Yoon Kyung-ho as Kim Dong-hwa
 Kim Kyeong-deok as Bae Goo-man
 Lee Hae-woon as Moon Sung-hyun
 Sung Hyuk as Kang Dae-cheon
 Hong In as Park Doo-man
 Yoo Su-bin as Sergeant
 Baek Joo-hee as Ticket counter staff

Special appearances
 Kim Min-jae as Kwak Sung-moo
 Go Doo-shim as Sang-pil's grandmother
 Park Hae-joon as Tae-sung

Production
Principal photography began on March 8, 2019 and filming was completed on June 27.

Reception

Critical response
Yoon Min-sik of The Korea Herald said that "the film initially felt like unoriginal, unfunny film, but it does a good job of creating likeable characters". However, "outside of the characters, the film doesn’t really offer much" as "the story is never sufficiently developed enough to be appealing" and "a lot of the jokes fall flat." Kim Boram of Yonhap gave a similar review, mentioning a story which "loses humor and becomes discursive and distracted as the film tries to deal with too many social issues" and a "corny and formulaic plot" with "not-so-flashy action scenes [that] will disappoint those who expect a big blockbuster."

Accolades

References

External links
 
 

2019 films
2010s Korean-language films
2019 comedy-drama films
South Korean comedy-drama films
Films based on South Korean webtoons
Next Entertainment World films
2010s South Korean films